De natis ultra mare, also known as the Those that are born beyond sea Act of 1350/1351, was an English statute during the reign of Edward III. It regulated rights of those born overseas, and was an early precursor of British nationality law, and others. Dating from 1351, during the early part of the Hundred Years' War, it addressed the issue of inheritance by foreign-born children, a topical problem.

This statute of 25 Ed III was invoked over 200 years later, in two matters; in the first of those, it did not prove effective since the outcome went in the other direction, but in the second it was significant. In the debate on the succession to Elizabeth I, it was thought by some to be telling against claimants of the House of Stuart. In Calvin's Case, it was also brought up, to argue against the proposed right of inheritance in England of the Scottish post-nati (those born after the Union of Crowns of 1603).

References

Acts of the Parliament of England
1350s in law
1351 in England
Medieval English law